Jack Holmes (born 5 January 1994) is a professional rugby league footballer who plays as a  for the North Wales Crusaders in Betfred League 1. 

Holmes has previously played for the Salford City Reds, Rochdale Hornets, Halifax, Oldham RLFC (Heritage № 1337) and the Leigh Centurions.

References

External links

Oldham profile
Rochdale Hornets profile

1994 births
Living people
English rugby league players
Halifax R.L.F.C. players
Leigh Leopards players
North Wales Crusaders players
Oldham R.L.F.C. players
Rochdale Hornets players
Rugby league centres
Rugby league fullbacks
Rugby league wingers
Salford Red Devils players